The Aristaeus-class repair ship was a class of repair ships of the United States Navy during the Second World War.

Development 
Thirteen ships was converted into a repair ship throughout the later stages of World War II. The ships were converted from the LST-1, LST-491 and LST-542 classes. After the war, few ships were then sold to foreign countries such as Brazil, Greece, Norway and West Germany.

The ship's hull remained nearly the same but with new equipments to carry out her purpose now placed on deck alongside several cranes. The ships' armament had been slightly changed and relocated to make way for the ships' equipments. All ships served in the Pacific Theater until the end of the war with no ships lost in combat.

MV Gordon Jensen (ex-USS Zeus) is still active to this day, serving as a transport and berthing vessel for SNOPAC Products Inc. processing crews in Alaska.

ARB-13 (ex-USS LST-50) was redesignated as a repair ship on 14 November 1952. She was sold to Norway as HNoMS Ellida (A534) and later sold to Greece as Sakipis (A329).

Ships of class

Citations